General elections were held in Western Samoa on 26 April 1996. The result was a victory for the Human Rights Protection Party, which won 24 of the 49 seats. The Samoan National Development Party won 11 seats, the Samoa Liberal Party 1, and independents 13. Following the elections, the 12th Samoan Parliament was sworn in on 16 May 1996. The HRRP was able to form a government with the support of 10 independent MPs.

Background

During the previous election held in 1991, the ruling Human Rights Protection Party, led by prime minister Tofilau Eti Alesana, won re-election with a simple majority of 27 seats in parliament. The opposition Samoan National Democratic Party, led by former prime minister Tui Ātua Tupua Tamasese Efi, secured 15 seats, whilst independents won the remaining five.

In January 1994, the government introduced a 'value-added tax' on services and goods, sparking widespread protests. This bill also led to demands that prime minister Tofilau resign. The demonstration concluded after two months when the government agreed to omit the most contentious aspects of the bill. Later that year, the legislative assembly approved a bill proposed by the HRPP government to extend the parliamentary from three to five years. Instead of waiting until the next election cycle for this to come into effect, the government implemented the bill immediately, drawing widespread criticism from individuals such as HRPP MP Matatumua Maimoana, who would later depart from the party. The legislature also voted to increase the parliamentary seat count from 47 to 49.

Western Samoa's chief auditor, Su'a Rimoni Ah Chong, released an annual report to parliament in 1994 that exposed widespread corruption within the HRPP government. Prime minister Tofilau responded by establishing a committee to investigate Su'a and had him suspended. Su'a then sued the legislative assembly and the attorney-general.

Results

See also
List of members of the Legislative Assembly of Samoa (1996–2001)

References

Elections in Samoa
Western Samoa
General
Election and referendum articles with incomplete results